The National Personal Protective Technology Laboratory (NPPTL) is a research center within the National Institute for Occupational Safety and Health located in  Pittsburgh, Pennsylvania, devoted to research on personal protective equipment (PPE). The NPPTL was created in 2001 at the request of the U.S. Congress, in response to a recognized need for improved research in PPE and technologies. It focuses on experimentation and recommendations for respirator masks, by ensuring a level of standard filter efficiency, and develops criteria for testing and developing PPE.

The laboratory conducts research and provides recommendations for other types of PPE, including protective clothing, gloves, eye protection, headwear, hearing protection, chemical sensors, and communication devices for safe deployment of emergency workers. It also maintains certification for N95 respirators, and hosts an annual education day for N95 education. Its emergency response research is part of a collaboration with the National Fire Protection Association. The NPPTL also maintains a searchable listing of equipment that it has certified.

In the 2010s, the NPPTL has focused on pandemic influenza preparedness, CBRNE incidents, miner PPE, and nanotechnology.

See also
 Laboratory
 National Institute for Occupational Safety and Health
 Occupational safety and health
 Personal protective equipment
 Respirator

External links
 The National Personal Protective Technology Laboratory - NPPTL homepage
 NPPTL research projects, 2015
 NPPTL Certified Equipment List - Searchable listing of Certified Equipment List
 NIOSH-Approved Particulate Filtering Facepiece Respirators - Information on respirators

References

Protective gear
National Institute for Occupational Safety and Health
Centers for Disease Control and Prevention